Jacksonville State Gamecocks basketball may refer to either of the basketball teams that represent Jacksonville State University:
Jacksonville State Gamecocks men's basketball
Jacksonville State Gamecocks women's basketball